Orlando Marín (23 September 1942 – 17 May 2014) was a Colombian footballer. He played in four matches for the Colombia national football team in 1963. He was also part of Colombia's squad for the 1963 South American Championship.

References

1942 births
2014 deaths
Colombian footballers
Colombia international footballers
Association football defenders
People from Manizales